Inala bus station at Inala, a south-western suburb in the City of Brisbane, is served by TransLink bus routes. Inala bus station is part of the Inala Plaza Shopping Centre. It is in Zone 2 of the TransLink integrated public transport system.

Buses conduct services from Inala bus station, through the Inala suburb to the surrounding suburbs and to railway stations nearest to Inala: Richlands, Darra, Oxley. Inala bus station also has connections to Forest Lake Village Shopping Centre, Mount Ommaney Shopping Centre, Garden City Shoppers Centre, Princess Alexandra Hospital and QEII Hospital, Salisbury, Moorooka and Coopers Plains railway stations, and to Woolloongabba busway station, South Bank and the Brisbane City via the frequent express bus route 100 that operates from early morning until late night.

References

Bus stations in Brisbane